Gursaran Pran Talwar is a medical researcher working in the area of vaccines and immunocontraception. In a 1994 paper, his group demonstrated that women could be vaccinated to prevent pregnancy. Gursaran Prasad Talwar received BSc (Hons) and MSc (Tech) degrees from the University of Punjab, DSc from Sorbonne working at the Institut Pasteur, Paris and DSc (hc) from Bundhelkhand University (2004). He was Alexander von Humboldt Postdoctoral Fellow at Tübingen, Stuttgart and Munich. He joined as associate professor of biochemistry (1956) in the newly created All India Institute of Medical Sciences (AIIMS), New Delhi, and also worked there as Professor and Head till 1983. He was Head, ICMR-WHO Research and Training Centre in Immunology for India and South East Asia (1972–91). He was the founding director of the National Institute of Immunology (NII) (1983–91) and also professor of eminence till 1994. He was professor of eminence and senior consultant, International Centre for Genetic Engineering and Biotechnology (ICGEB), New Delhi (1994–99) and director research, Talwar Research Foundation, New Delhi (2000- ). He was visiting professor, College de France (1991), Wellcome Professor at Johns Hopkins (1994–95), and distinguished professor at the Institute of Bioinformatics and Biotechnology, University of Pune (2005–10).

Awards
Legion of Honour
Padma Bhusan
The Golden Jubilee Commemoration Medal (Bio. Sci.)

References

Indian medical researchers
Living people
Recipients of the Padma Bhushan in medicine
20th-century Indian biologists
Year of birth missing (living people)